Piletocera viperalis is a moth in the family Crambidae. It was described by Achille Guenée in 1862. It is found on Réunion.

References

viperalis
Moths described in 1862
Moths of Africa